Microtragus cristulatus is a species of beetle in the family Cerambycidae. It was described by Per Olof Christopher Aurivillius in 1917 and is known from Australia.

References

Parmenini
Beetles described in 1917